William Thomas Langford (5 October 1875 – 20 February 1957) was an English first-class cricketer. He was a right-handed batsman who bowled right-arm fast-medium pace.

Langford made his first-class debut for Hampshire in the 1925 County Championship against Leicestershire at Aylestone Road.

Langford played 93 first-class matches for Hampshire, with the 1906 season being his most successful with 66 wickets at a bowling average of 26.46, with one five wicket haul and one ten wicket haul in a match, with best figures of 8/82. Indeed, it can be said that Langford did not have a bad season with the ball in the seasons he represented Hampshire, taking 215 wicket at a bowling average of 26.88 five five wicket hauls and two ten wickets in a match hauls and career best figures of 8/82 against the touring West Indies.

Langford played his final first-class match for Hampshire in 1908 against Middlesex at Dean Park Cricket Ground in Bournemouth.

As well as his above mentioned ability with the ball, Langford was also a useful batsman. In his 153 innings for Hampshire he scored 1,663 runs at a batting average of 26.88, with 2 half centuries and a high score of 67 in 1904 against Somerset. In the field Longford took 37 catches.

Following his first-class career he was the cricket coach at Tonbridge School, Kent. Langford died at Ospringe, Kent on 20 February 1957.

External links
William Langford at Cricinfo
William Langford at CricketArchive
Matches and detailed statistics for William Langford

1875 births
1957 deaths
People from New Forest District
English cricketers
Hampshire cricketers
English cricket coaches
Schoolteachers from Hampshire